Sarvodaya Nagar is an area in North Indian city of Lucknow consisting of both residential and commercial settlements. It is a part of Mahona Nagar Panchayat in Lucknow district.

Geography
Bank of Gomti River that flows through north and western boundaries of Sarvodaya Nagar. It has an average elevation of 122.6 metres (402 feet). 
It was known as "ghosi purva"and today is also known for its drain called " kukrail naala".
It is home to both Hindus and Muslims and thus has several mosques like badi  masjid ;chhoti masjid;madina masjid; as well as temple of Sai baba .
It has several primary English and Hindi medium schools that help the poor people .
It has a cemetery as well.

Religious integrity
Most of the peoples of Sarvodaya Nagar follow Hindu ...secondly Muslim religion and show a good example of religious integrity. It is reflected by presence of two mosques (Chhoti Masjid and Bari Masjid) and 5 temple and a big graveyard for Muslims and one cremation place for Hindus in Sarvodaya Nagar..

Transport
Nearest railway station from Sarvodaya Nagar is Badshah Nagar, which is situated on Lucknow - Barabanki railway line maintained by North-East Railway. The transportation is mainly road based. It is connected with the city through City Bus, auto rickshaw and rickshaw etc. Most of the residents have their own conveyances.

Education
Sarvodaya Nagar has Government School and a few convent schools like Rani Laxmi Bai, Meridian School, Motherland school, etc. Sarvodaya Nagar is well connected and one can access almost all the prominent places like Indira Nagar, Aliganj, Gomti Nagar, Hazratganj, Mahanagar easily.

Neighbourhoods in Lucknow